August Wagner Breweries, Inc., was a regional brewer in Columbus, Ohio. It marketed beers in Ohio, Indiana and West Virginia under the Augustiner, Mark V, Robin Hood and Gambrinus brand names, which were once popular products within this region.

History 

Like many other brewers, August Wagner immigrated from Germany in the late 1800s. After honing his craft at various brewers in Ohio, he founded the Gambrinus Brewing and Bottling Company in 1906. The company survived Prohibition under the name of "The August Wagner and Sons Products Company, Incorporated." Beer production resumed in 1933 following the repeal of Prohibition and the company was renamed "The August Wagner and Sons Brewing Company." In 1937 the company was renamed "August Wagner Breweries, Inc." August’s daughter Helen A. Wagner, Vice President of the brewery,  appeared on the CBS game show “What’s My Line” on June 3, 1962.  

The brewery was owned by the Wagner family until 1968, when it was purchased by a group of investors from Detroit, Michigan. In 1970 August Wagner Breweries purchased The Little Switzerland Brewing Company of Huntington, West Virginia, formerly known as the Fesenmeier Brewing Company. The Huntington plant was closed in 1971 and production was moved to Columbus; the Columbus brewery closed in January, 1974. The brewery was sold to the Dispatch Printing Company, which later razed the brewery and developed office buildings on the property. The Pittsburgh Brewing Company purchased the brand names and other assets of the company and continued distributing beer under the Mark V, Robin Hood and Gambrinus brands.

Gambrinus, the company's most popular brand, was named after King Gambrinus, the legendary king of Flanders reputed for his mythical brewing abilities. A statue of King Gambrinus graced the front of the brewery for many years and continues to stand in the Brewery District in front of the Dispatch-owned office buildings constructed there. August Wagner is credited as the model for that particular statue.

See also
 Gambrinus, patron saint of beer.

References

External links
 Brewing Beer In The Capital City: Volume II, Gambrinus/August Wagner & the Breweries of Newark
 Gambrinus Brewing Company
 King Gambrinus, Inventor of Beer
 Ohio Secretary of State Corporate Records
 August Wagner Breweries, Inc. (Original Corporate Charter), Charter No. 86259
 August Wagner Breweries, Inc. (Reorganized Entity Charter), Charter No. 230779
 August Wagner Realty Company (The), Charter No. 86258

Beer brewing companies based in Ohio
1906 establishments in Ohio
1974 disestablishments in Ohio
Culture of Columbus, Ohio